Kurt Meisel (18 August 1912 – 4 April 1994) was an Austrian actor and film director. He appeared in 65 films between 1934 and 1994. He also directed 21 films between 1949 and 1984. Meisel was married to the actress Ursula Lingen. He was born and died in Vienna, Austria, and is buried on the Vienna Zentralfriedhof.

Selected filmography

 Little Dorrit (1934) - Pit, sein Sohn
 Marriage Strike (1935) - Loisl
 Schlußakkord (1936) - Baron Salviany
 The Court Concert (1936) - Leutnant Florian Schwälble
 The Divine Jetta (1937) - Graf Eugen Opalla
 Such Great Foolishness (1937) - Specht - Rundfunkansager
 Love Can Lie (1937) - August Halfgreen
 Spiel auf der Tenne (1937) - Andreas 'Anderl' Rössmaier
 Another World (1937) - 2. Journalist
 Der Schimmelkrieg in der Holledau (1937) - Thomas, Bräubursch
 Frau Sylvelin (1938) - Herr von Roedern
 Nanon (1938) - Hector
 The Scoundrel (1939) - Ferdinand Scheibler
 A Woman Like You (1939) - Felix Petersen
 Eine kleine Nachtmusik (1940) - Max
 The Fire Devil (1940) - Erzherzog Johann
  (1940) - Francois Coogmann, Kunstmaler
 Der Weg ins Freie (1941) - Ein Student
 Menschen im Sturm (1941) - Oberleutnant Duschan
 The Great King (1942) - Alfons
 The Rainer Case (1942) - Leutnant von Benda
 Die goldene Stadt (1942) - Toni Opferkuch - Annas Vetter, der Anna verführt
 Kolberg (1945) - Claus Werner
 Wozzeck (1947) - Wozzeck
  (1949) - Karli Reindl
 Love on Ice (1950) - Toni Staudtner
 Der Teufel führt Regie (1951) - Poupoulle
 Until We Meet Again (1952) - Willy Wagner
 All Clues Lead to Berlin (1952) - Gregor Pratt
 Arena of Death (1953 - director)
  (1954) - Figaro, valet
 Emil and the Detectives (1954) - Herr Grundeis
 They Were So Young (1954) - Pasquale
 Hello, My Name is Cox (1955) - Oberkellner Youmac
 Jackboot Mutiny (1955) - SS Obergruppenführer
 Operation Sleeping Bag (1955) - Oberleutnant Taut
 Zwei blaue Augen (1955) - Eddi Witt
  (1956) - Mann auf dem Schiff (uncredited)
 Vater sein dagegen sehr (1957) - Schneider
 Drei Mann auf einem Pferd (1957) - Freddy
 The Cat (1958) - Capitaine Heinz Muller
 A Time to Love and a Time to Die (1958) - Heini
  (1958) - Mojmir
  (1959) - Baron de Tavel
 Dorothea Angermann (1959) - Mario Malloneck
 Court Martial (1959, Director)
 The Red Hand (1960, director)
 The Longest Day (1962) - Capt. Ernst Düring (uncredited)
  (1963, TV film) - Major Mokry
 The Spendthrift (1964, director)
  (1966) - Sapparov
  (1966) - Semmelbein, the jeweler
 Man on Horseback (1969) - Kanzler
 Strogoff (1970) - Feofar Khan
 The Odessa File (1974) - Alfred Oster
 Derrick – Season 3, Episode 14: "Der Mann aus Portofino" (1976) - Ingo Parenge
  (1986) - Eisenbeiss
 The Post Office Girl (1988, TV film) - Hofrat Elkins

References

External links

1912 births
1994 deaths
Male actors from Vienna
Austrian male film actors
Austrian male television actors
Austrian film directors
Austrian television directors
German-language film directors
20th-century Austrian male actors
Burials at the Vienna Central Cemetery
Lingen family